Archduke Franz Karl Salvator of Austria (17 February 1893 in Schloss Lichtenegg, Wels, Upper Austria, Austria-Hungary – 10 December 1918, Wallsee-Sindelburg, Lower Austria, Austria) was a member of the Tuscan line of the House of Habsburg and Archduke of Austria, Prince of Tuscany by birth. He died of the Spanish flu.

Biography
Salvator was the eldest son of Archduke Franz Salvator of Austria, Prince of Tuscany and his wife Archduchess Marie Valerie of Austria. Through his mother, Franz Karl Salvator was a grandson of Emperor Franz Joseph I of Austria, and through his father, he was a great-grandson of Leopold II, Grand Duke of Tuscany.

Franz Karl left the military school as a first lieutenant. During the First World War, he served as a lieutenant from 1915 to 1918 in operations against Russia, Serbia and Romania. He lived to see the end of the war and the dissolution of Austria-Hungary in November 1918, but he was already very ill. Franz Karl died at Wallsee Castle on 10 December 1918, at the age of 25, of the Spanish flu, which had been around since the end of October. He was unmarried and had no children.

Ancestry

Sources 
 the article in the German Wikipedia, Franz Karl von Österreich-Toskana.''

1893 births
1918 deaths
House of Habsburg-Lorraine
People from Wiener Neustadt-Land District
Knights of the Golden Fleece of Austria
Austrian princes
Tuscan princes
Deaths from Spanish flu
Austro-Hungarian military personnel of World War I
Austro-Hungarian Army officers